Dumardih  is a village in Gumla district of Jharkhand state of India.

References

Villages in Gumla district